David Randall Knight is a former professional American football player who played wide receiver for five seasons for the New York Jets in the National Football League.

References

1951 births
Living people
Sportspeople from Alexandria, Virginia
American football wide receivers
William & Mary Tribe football players
New York Jets players
Players of American football from Virginia